The Indianapolis mayoral election of 2007 took place on November 6, 2007. Voters elected the Mayor of Indianapolis, members of the Indianapolis City-County Council, as well as several other local officials. Incumbent Democrat Bart Peterson was seeking a third term. Republicans nominated former Marine Greg Ballard to run against Peterson. In what was called "the biggest upset in Indiana political history", Ballard defeated Peterson 51% to 47%.

The Indianapolis City-County elections took place alongside the mayoral election.

Candidates
 Democrat Bart Peterson, incumbent Mayor, ran for a third term.
 Republican Greg Ballard
 Libertarian Fred Peterson

Campaign
Peterson was vastly considered a lock to win the election by political experts. The incumbent Peterson had nearly 30 times as much campaign money as the challenger. Peterson, who started with considerable fundraising advantages, raised nearly $1.5 million since April and had $1.5 million left in late October. In contrast, Ballard raised nearly $225,000 since April and had just over $51,000 left in his campaign fund in late October. Peterson spent nearly $1.5 million on TV and radio ads and $113,000 on polling and research. Two weeks before election day, Ballard had still not put up any TV ads.

Issues
The two major issues in the mayoral campaign were crime and taxes. Residents felt property taxes were most important due to the spike in the tax. Rising crime was another major issue in the election.

Election results

References

2007
2007 United States mayoral elections
2007 Indiana elections